The Anglican Province of Kwara is one of the 14 ecclesiastical provinces of the Church of Nigeria. It comprises 7 dioceses. The Archbishop of the Province of Kwara and Bishop of New Bussa is Israel Amoo.

The dioceses are (2021):

Igbomina (Bishop: Emmanuel Adekola)
Igbomina-West (Bishop: Olajide Adebayo)
Jebba (Bishop: Oluwaseun A. Aderogba)
Kwara (Bishop: S. T. G. Adewole; first bishop, Herbert Haruna, consecrated 27 October 1974, Ibadan)
New Bussa (Bishop: Israel Amoo)
Offa (Bishop: Solomon Akanbi)
Omu-Aran (Bishop: Festus Oyetola Sobanke)
Ekiti Kwara (Bishop: Andrew O.A. Ajayi)

Archbishops of Kwara 
 Until 2017   Michael Akinyemi
 2017 - 2019  Olusegun Adeyemi
 2019 - date  Israel Amoo

References

External links
Anglican Province of Kwara at Anglican Communion Official Website Anglican Province of Kwara at Anglican Communion Official Website

Church of Nigeria ecclesiastical provinces